H-Town may refer to:

 a nickname of Houston, Texas, U.S.
 Nicknames of Houston
 a nickname of Hamilton, New Zealand
 H-Town (band), a R&B music group active from 1990s to present
 "H-Town", a song by Dizzee Rascal from the album The Fifth